Yitzhak "Ike" Aronowicz (August 27, 1923 – December 23, 2009) was an Israeli sailor, best known as the captain of the immigrant ship SS Exodus, which unsuccessfully tried to dock in British-era Palestine with Holocaust survivors on July 11, 1947, after the end of World War II. His surname was later spelled as Ahronovitch.

Born in Łódź, he grew up in the Free City of Danzig (now Gdańsk, Poland) and came to Mandate Palestine at the age of 10. Aged 23, he was the captain of the SS Exodus, on its trip from the port of Sète, France, a fishing town on July 11, 1947, carrying 4,515 passengers which was intercepted by a fleet of British war ships led by the British Royal Navy cruiser Ajax and a convoy of destroyers trailed the ship from very early in its voyage. Two British destroyers rammed the ship. After several hours of hand-to-hand combat between passengers armed with smoke bombs trying to prevent British sailors from boarding the ship, the British opened fire. Two immigrants and a crewman were killed, and many passengers seriously wounded. The ship was towed to Haifa, where it was abandoned. The passengers were deported to France, and then to Lübeck, Germany. In late 1947, he served as the captain of the Pan York, another ship attempting to bring Jewish refugees to Palestine past the British blockade.

He was a highly experienced naval officer and had sailed with many ships. In 1949, following the establishment of the State of Israel, he went to study in the United Kingdom. He took an officers course in London - for third, then second, and then first officer. At this time, he also married Irene, an American woman from Berkeley who was not Jewish. In Israel, Aronowicz entered the shipping business. In 1951, he led a sailors' strike which was broken up by the Israeli government. In 1958, Aronowicz went to study in United States, earning a BA in international relations from Georgetown University and an MBA in economics from Columbia University. While studying in the United States, he worked as a driver for the Israeli Embassy. After completing his studies, he returned with his family to Israel and eventually establishing his own shipping company, running lines to China, Singapore, and Iran.

Death
Aronowicz died in Israel on December 23, 2009, aged 86. He was survived by two daughters, seven grandchildren, and two great-grandchildren.

In a statement after his death Shimon Peres, the Israeli president, said Ahronovitch had "made a unique contribution to the state which will never be forgotten".

References 

1923 births
2009 deaths
Israeli sailors
People from the Free City of Danzig
Polish emigrants to Mandatory Palestine
Columbia Business School alumni
Walsh School of Foreign Service alumni
Israeli businesspeople in shipping
Aliyah Bet activists